Imajuku may refer to:

 (born 1978), Japanese model, actress and singer
Imajuku Station (今宿駅), a railway station in Fukuoka Prefecture, Japan

Japanese-language surnames